The Grammy Award for Best Gospel Performance, Traditional was awarded from 1978 to 1983. Before and after this time from 1968 to 1977 and from 2005 this category was a part of the Grammy Award for Best Gospel/Contemporary Christian Music Performance.

Years reflect the year in which the Grammy Awards were presented, for works released in the previous year.

Recipients

References

Performance, Traditional